These are the election results of the 2008 Malaysian general election by state constituency. State assembly elections were held in Malaysia on 8 March 2008 as part of the general elections. These members of the legislative assembly (MLAs) representing their constituency from the first sitting of respective state legislative assembly to its dissolution.

The state legislature election deposit was set at RM 5,000 per candidate. Similar to previous elections, the election deposit will be forfeited if the particular candidate had failed to secure at least 12.5% or one-eighth of the votes.

Perlis

Kedah

Kelantan

Terengganu

Penang

Perak

Pahang

Selangor

Negeri Sembilan

Malacca

Johor

Sabah

2008
2008 elections in Malaysia
2008 in Malaysia
Election results in Malaysia